Falagueira-Venda Nova is a civil parish in the municipality of Amadora, Portugal. It was formed in 2013 by the merger of the former parishes Falagueira and Venda Nova. The population in 2011 was 23,186, in an area of 2.86 km2.

References

Parishes of Amadora